Valparaiso Harbor is an oil on canvas painting of 1866 by the American aestheticism artist James McNeill Whistler.

References

1866 paintings
Paintings in the collection of the Smithsonian American Art Museum